Punk Goes Classic Rock is the ninth album in the Punk Goes... series, released by Fearless Records on April 27, 2010. The album contains another cover of the Outfield's "Your Love", this time by I See Stars, which was first covered by Midtown on Punk Goes 80's in 2005. Also included with the album is an additional Bonus CD Sampler with each physical copy.

The Japan edition of the album contains two extra bonus tracks of covers by Japanese bands.

Track listing
On February 23, 2010, the official track listing was released on the Punk Goes Classic Rock Myspace.

Japanese Edition
The Japanese version contains the following two bonus tracks.

References

Covers albums
Punk Goes series
2010 compilation albums